Grigor Ter-Hovhannisian (December 1, 1854 – September 12, 1908), better known as Muratsan, was a prolific Armenian writer, known best for writing Gevorg Marzpetuni (1896), a historical novel set during the time of King Ashot II in Armenia in the tenth century.

Biography 

Muratsan was born in the city of Shushi to a middle-class family. His father was a craftsman. Until the age of 12 he studied at a local private school. He was forced to cease his education due to his father's death. Two years later he enrolled in the diocesan school, from which he graduated in June 1873. In 1877 he traveled within Artsakh and researched much of the ancient ruins. Upon his return to Shushi he wrote a brief history of the noble Hasan-Jalalyan family. In 1878 he moved to Tiflis, where he worked as a teacher and accountant and remained for the rest of his life. He became famous after the production of his historical drama Ruzan at a Tiflis theater in 1882. In addition to Gevorg Marzpetuni, he wrote many short stories and novels, including The Apostle (1902). An intensely nationalistic writer, Muratsan was a nineteenth-century Romantic in style and an advocate of traditional cultural and religious values.

A hospital, a street, and a school are named after him in Armenia and the Republic of Artsakh.

Ruzan 
Ruzan is a historical drama which takes place in the thirteenth century during the Mongol-Tatar invasions. Ruzan was the daughter of prince Hasan-Jalal Dawla. Faced with the choice of conversion or death, she refuses to betray her countrymen and her religion and as a consequence is executed.

Miscellaneous 
Muratsan's "There will come a spring with a single flower" (Մի ծաղկով գարուն կգա) is a widely known saying which means that even a single man is capable of a radical change.

Notes

External links
 
 

Writers from Shusha
Soviet writers
Armenian people from the Russian Empire
1908 deaths
1854 births
Armenian male writers
Burials at Armenian Pantheon of Tbilisi